Sergio García de la Fuente (born 9 June 1983) is a Spanish former professional footballer. Mainly a forward, he could also appear as a winger, preferably on the right. 

After starting out at Barcelona, he went on to represent mainly Zaragoza and Espanyol, serving as captain of the latter. Over 14 seasons, he amassed La Liga totals of 360 matches and 75 goals.

García appeared for Spain at Euro 2008, winning the tournament. He also played for the Catalonia national team in unofficial matches.

Club career

Barcelona
Born in Barcelona, Catalonia, García rose through the ranks of FC Barcelona, finding however opportunities almost non-existent in the senior squad. A frequent goalscorer for the reserves in the Segunda División B, he made his first-team debut on 29 October 2002, coming on as a substitute for Geovanni for the final 28 minutes of a 2–0 away win against Club Brugge KV in that season's UEFA Champions League; he made another cameo in that competition the following 19 March, in a 2–0 victory at Newcastle United in the second group phase.

On 3 September 2003, García started in his La Liga debut in his first match at the Camp Nou, a 1–1 draw with Sevilla FC. On 1 March of the following year, he signed a three-year contract extension.

García was loaned to Levante UD on 21 July 2004, ahead of the upcoming top-flight campaign. He scored his first goal in the competition on 3 October to complete a 2–0 win over RCD Mallorca at the Estadi Ciutat de València, ranking team top scorer as the Valencians were relegated; his last goal came on 5 May 2004 in a 3–1 away loss to Albacete Balompié, where he was sent off moments later for fighting with Santi.

Zaragoza
Garcia played all 38 matches for Real Zaragoza in 2007–08, as they were eventually relegated from the top tier. At the beginning of the following season, he was linked with a number of Premier League clubs including Liverpool, Tottenham Hotspur, West Ham United and Stoke City, along with teammate Diego Milito. Rumours that he would leave Zaragoza had been further fuelled after the club's relegation, as he was thrown out of a side pre-season training session by manager Marcelino García Toral and was then left out of their opening day defeat against Levante.

Betis
On 1 September 2008, in the dying seconds of the transfer window, after continuous rumours, García signed for Real Betis, for a fee close to €10 million. He scored his first goal for his new club on 27 September in the team's home game against Real Madrid (1–2 loss), following up on his own saved penalty. On 16 November he netted a brace in at 3–1 home win over Racing de Santander and, on 18 January of the following year, added another in the 3–1 away defeat of Real Valladolid in which he also assisted the other goal.

García was sent off three times in the first half of the season. On 7 February 2009, he helped Betis achieve a landmark victory at neighbouring Sevilla, scoring in a 2–1 win. In form, he was struck with a knee injury after celebrating his goal against CD Numancia, a 3–3 home draw on 4 April, eventually missing a month of competition – with the team struggling during this time – and eventually dropping down a level at the end.

García scored 12 goals in the 2009–10 campaign, but the Andalusians failed to win promotion.

Espanyol
In August 2010, García signed a five-year contract with RCD Espanyol, moving to the club as a replacement to veteran Raúl Tamudo who left after nearly 20 years of service. He did not score in his first 15 games for Mauricio Pochettino's team, ending the drought on 9 January 2011 when as a substitute he concluded a 4–0 home victory over former team Zaragoza, assisted by his namesake Luis.

On 24 November 2013, García scored his first hat-trick for the Pericos in a 4–1 win at Rayo Vallecano – two of his three goals came from the penalty spot. The following season, he netted a career-best (in Spain) 14 league goals.

Al-Rayyan
García turned down an offer to join Qatar's Al Sadd SC, who had recently signed Barcelona's Xavi. On 29 June, however, he joined Al-Rayyan SC in the same country. He made his debut on 11 September, starting in a 4–0 Stars League home win against Al-Sailiya SC, and scored his first goal on 2 October when he confirmed a 2–0 victory over Al-Mesaimeer Sports Club at the Thani bin Jassim Stadium; on 22 November, he scored twice and assisted one of Rodrigo Tabata's four goals in a league record 9–0 rout at Qatar SC.

On 5 March 2016, García netted once in a 5–0 win at Al-Wakrah Sport Club that handed his team their first league title in 21 years, and with five games to spare.

Later career
On 16 June 2017, aged 34, García returned to Espanyol after agreeing to a one-year contract. Exactly two years later, he left.

In November 2020, García returned to football at Nou Barris-based CF Montañesa of the Tercera División, signing alongside his former Barcelona and Espanyol teammate Joan Verdú.

International career

García was part of the Spain under-19 team that won the 2002 UEFA European Championship in Norway, equalising in the 3–1 win over Slovakia in their final group game in Drammen. On 22 October 2003, against the same country but at under-20 level, he netted a hat-trick in a 4–0 win in preparation for the FIFA World Youth Championship. During the tournament in the United Arab Emirates, he scored against Mali in the group and netted the only goal against Paraguay in the last 16, as the nation finished as runners-up.

Without having been previously capped, García made the Spanish final squad-of-23 for UEFA Euro 2008 (which Spain went on to win) as a replacement for Barcelona's Bojan Krkić. He made his debut for the national side on 31 May 2008, coming on as an 83rd-minute substitute for David Silva in a 2–1 friendly win against Peru in Huelva. He made his debut on 18 June, playing for the full 90 minutes against Greece in Spain's third and final group D game in Euro 2008: in the 88th minute, he delivered a pinpoint left-footed cross for Dani Güiza to head home the 2–1 winner.

García also represented Spain at all youth levels, as well as appearing frequently for the unofficial Catalan national team. On 22 December 2009, he scored the side's first goal in a 4–2 defeat of Argentina and, on 30 December 2013, he netted twice in a 4–1 victory over Cape Verde. In March 2019, he played his 16th game against Venezuela in Girona, and surpassed Sergio González as the most capped player in its history.

Career statistics

Club

Honours
Al-Rayan
Qatar Stars League: 2015–16

Spain
UEFA European Championship: 2008

Spain U19
UEFA European Under-19 Championship: 2002

Spain U20
FIFA U-20 World Cup runner-up: 2003

Notes

References

External links

1983 births
Living people
Spanish footballers
Footballers from Barcelona
Association football wingers
Association football forwards
La Liga players
Segunda División players
Segunda División B players
Tercera División players
CF Damm players
FC Barcelona C players
FC Barcelona Atlètic players
FC Barcelona players
Levante UD footballers
Real Zaragoza players
Real Betis players
RCD Espanyol footballers
CF Montañesa players
Qatar Stars League players
Al-Rayyan SC players
Spain youth international footballers
Spain under-21 international footballers
Spain international footballers
UEFA Euro 2008 players
UEFA European Championship-winning players
Catalonia international footballers
Spanish expatriate footballers
Expatriate footballers in Qatar
Spanish expatriate sportspeople in Qatar